Yoshio Okita (Japanese: 沖田 芳夫, March 28, 1903 – April 28, 2001) was a Japanese track and field athlete who won a gold medal in the discus throw at the 1927 Far Eastern Championship Games. He competed in the hammer and discus throw at the 1928 Summer Olympics and placed 15th and 30th, respectively. He also attended the 1932 and 1936 Olympics as a field coach for the Japanese athletics team. In 1993 Okita took part in the World Masters Athletics Championships. Being the sole hammer throw competitor in the over 90 years age group he won the event with a result of 12.1 m.

References

1903 births
2001 deaths
Japanese male hammer throwers
Japanese male discus throwers
Olympic male hammer throwers
Olympic male discus throwers
Olympic athletes of Japan
Athletes (track and field) at the 1928 Summer Olympics
Japan Championships in Athletics winners
20th-century Japanese people
21st-century Japanese people